Reuben David Sassoon, MVO (1835–1905) was an English businessman.

Biography

Early life
Reuben David Sassoon was born in 1835. His father was David Sassoon (1792–1864), a Jewish trader of opium and cotton in China who served as the Treasurer of Baghdad from 1817 to 1829. One of his brothers was Arthur Sassoon (1840–1912).

Career
He worked for his father's company, serving as director of David Sassoon & Co. for East India and China.

By 1865, he also served on the board of directors of the China Steamship and Labuan Coal Company alongside T.C. Bruce, Sir J.D. Elphinstone, Harry Borradaile, H.B. Loch, Henry Alers Hankey, William Miller, Edward Pereira, G. Lathom Brown, Alexander Sinclair, James N. Daniel and John Hickie.

He was awarded a Royal Victorian Order.

Judaism
Together with Abraham Jacob David and Marcus David Ezekiel, he was involved with the Ohel Leah Synagogue near Staunton Street in Hong Kong by 1898.

Personal life
He was married to Catherine Sassoon (1838–1906). They resided at 7 Queens Gardens (now demolished) in Brighton & Hove, East Sussex. They had 6 children:
 Rachel Sassoon (1860)
 Luna Sassoon (1866)
 David Reuben Sassoon (1867)
 Mozelle Sassoon (1869)
 Flora Cecilia Sassoon
 Judith Louise Sassoon (1874–1964). She married Charles Cavendish Boyle (1849–1916), and she became a member of the Order of the British Empire.

He died in 1905. His wife died a year later, in 1906, and she was buried in the Novo Beth Chaim Cemetery in Mile End, East London. Photographers Maull & Fox took his portrait in costume as a Persian prince for the Duchess of Devonshire's 1897 fancy-dress ball. A photogravure of his portrait by Walker & Boutall was printed in an album of portraits of some of the people who attended the ball; a copy of that album now rests in the National Portrait Gallery in London.

References

1835 births
1905 deaths
People from Brighton and Hove
Reuben David
English Jews
Members of the Royal Victorian Order
19th-century English businesspeople
English people of Indian-Jewish descent
British businesspeople of Indian descent
Baghdadi Jews